Events from the year 2002 in Iran.

Incumbents
 Supreme Leader: Ali Khamenei
 President: Mohammad Khatami
 Vice President: Mohammad-Reza Aref
 Chief Justice: Mahmoud Hashemi Shahroudi

Events
 12 February – Iran Air Tours Flight 956 crashes in Tehran.
 22 June – The 6.3  Bou'in-Zahra earthquake shook northwestern Iran with a maximum Mercalli intensity of VIII (Severe). Two hundred and sixty-one people were killed and 1,500 were injured.
 Creation of Iran’s primary nuclear reactor in Bushehr gets under way with the assist of Russian engineers.

Establishments
 Parsian Bank.

Notable births

Notable deaths
 October 4 – Ahmad Mahmoud, 71, Iranian novelist.

See also
 Years in Iraq
 Years in Afghanistan

References

 
Iran
Years of the 21st century in Iran
2000s in Iran
Iran